The Levanne (singular: Levanna) is a group of mountains of Savoie, France and of the Metropolitan City of Turin, Italy. It lies in the Graian Alps range. The three main peaks are:
 Levanna Orientale - 3.555 m
 Levanna Centrale - 3.619 m
 Levanna Occidentale - 3.593 m

Mountains of Savoie
Mountains of Piedmont
Alpine three-thousanders
Mountains of the Graian Alps
France–Italy border
International mountains of Europe
Mountains partially in France